Optik Software is a former game development company, best known for creating the DOS game War Inc. in 1997.

See also
Index of DOS games

References

Defunct video game companies of the United States